The 2018 Connecticut gubernatorial election took place on November 6, 2018, to elect the next governor and lieutenant governor of Connecticut, concurrently with the election of Connecticut's Class I U.S. Senate seat, as well as other elections to the United States Senate in other states, elections to the United States House of Representatives, and various state and local elections. This race's Democratic margin of victory was the closest to the national average of 3.1 points. (It was 0.1 point more Democratic.)

As Connecticut does not have gubernatorial term limits, incumbent Democratic Governor Dannel Malloy was eligible to run for a third term, but declined to do so. After the resignation of Kansas Governor Sam Brownback in January 2018, Malloy became the most unpopular governor in the United States. The general election was between 2006 Democratic U.S. Senate nominee and businessman Ned Lamont, and Republican businessman Bob Stefanowski. Independent candidate and former Republican Oz Griebel has been called a spoiler candidate for Stefanowski, earning 3.89% of the vote.

Democratic primary

Governor

Democratic nominee
Ned Lamont, businessman, former Greenwich Selectman, nominee for the U.S. Senate in 2006 and candidate for Governor of Connecticut in 2010 (endorsed by the state party)

Lost the Democratic primary
Joe Ganim, mayor of Bridgeport and nominee for lieutenant governor in 1994

Withdrew prior to the Democratic primary
 Dan Drew, Mayor of Middletown
 Jonathan Harris, former mayor of West Hartford and former Connecticut State Senator (endorsed Lamont)
 Susan Bysiewicz, Secretary of the State of Connecticut from 1999 to 2011 and candidate for the U.S. Senate in 2012 (running for Lieutenant Governor of Connecticut; endorsed Lamont)
 Sean Connolly, former state commissioner for Veterans' Affairs (endorsed Lamont)
 Guy L. Smith, businessman

Declined
 Dita Bhargava, former hedge fund manager and former vice chair of the Democratic Party of Connecticut (ran for Treasurer of Connecticut)
 Luke Bronin, Mayor of Hartford since 2015
 Joe Courtney, U.S. Representative since 2007 (ran for reelection)
 Elizabeth Esty, U.S. Representative since 2013 (retiring)
 Toni Harp, Mayor of New Haven since 2013 (endorsed Lamont)
 Jim Himes, U.S. Representative since 2009 (ran for reelection)
 George Jepsen, Attorney General of Connecticut since 2011 (retired)
 Edward M. Kennedy Jr., state senator and member of the Kennedy family (retired)
 Kevin Lembo, State Comptroller of Connecticut since 2011 (ran for reelection)
 Martin Looney, state senator, president pro tempore of the Connecticut Senate
 Dan Malloy, Governor of Connecticut since 2011 (retired)
 Rudy Marconi, Ridgefield First Selectman
 Chris Mattei, attorney and former federal prosecutor (ran for attorney general)
 Nancy Wyman, Lieutenant Governor of Connecticut since 2011 (retired)
 John Larson, U.S. Representative since 1999 (ran for reelection; endorsed Lamont)

Primary endorsements

Results

Lieutenant Governor

Democratic nominee
 Susan Bysiewicz, former Secretary of the State of Connecticut and candidate for the U.S. Senate in 2012 (endorsed by the state party)

Lost the Democratic primary
 Eva Bermúdez Zimmerman, activist

Withdrew
Liz Linehan, state representative
 Drew Marzullo, Greenwich Selectman
 Charlie Stallworth, state representative

Results

Republican primary

Governor

Republican nominee
 Bob Stefanowski, businessman

Endorsed by the state party; lost the Republican primary
Mark Boughton, Mayor of Danbury, nominee for lieutenant governor in 2010 and candidate for governor in 2014 (endorsed by the state party)

Lost the Republican primary
 Tim Herbst, former First Selectman of Trumbull and nominee for state treasurer in 2014
 Stephen A. Obsitnik, businessman and nominee for CT-04 in 2012
 David Stemerman, businessman

Eliminated at Convention
 Mike Handler, Stamford Director of Administration
 Mark Lauretti, Mayor of Shelton and candidate for governor and lieutenant governor in 2014 (endorsed Stefanowski)
 Peter Lumaj, attorney and nominee for secretary of state in 2014 (endorsed Stefanowski)
 Prasad Srinivasan, state representative (endorsed Herbst)
 David M. Walker, former United States Comptroller General and candidate for lieutenant governor in 2014 (endorsed Stefanowski)

Withdrew prior to the Convention
 Erin Stewart, Mayor of New Britain (ran for lieutenant governor)
 Joe Visconti, former West Hartford Councilman and independent candidate for governor in 2014 (ran for U.S. Senate)
 Peter Thalheim, attorney and builder

Declined
 Toni Boucher, state senator
 Len Fasano, state senator, president pro tempore of the Connecticut Senate
 Rob Kane, Auditor of Public Accounts and former state senator
 Themis Klarides, Minority Leader of the Connecticut House of Representatives
 Joe Markley, state senator (running for lieutenant governor)
 Tom Foley, former U.S. Ambassador to Ireland and nominee for governor in 2010 and 2014
 Tony Hwang, state senator
 John P. McKinney, former state senator and candidate for governor in 2014

Convention
The Republican statewide nominating convention was held May 11–12, 2018 at Foxwoods Resort Casino in Ledyard, Connecticut.

Under the rules established by the convention, any candidate not receiving at least eight percent of the vote would be eliminated in the first round of voting.  In the second round of voting, candidates not receiving 15 percent of the vote would be eliminated.  In all subsequent rounds of voting, the candidate with the fewest votes would be eliminated, regardless of percentage.  Voting would continue until one candidate receives 50 percent plus one of all votes cast.

Results at the Convention

Primary endorsements

Polling

Results

Lieutenant Governor

Republican nominee
 Joe Markley, state senator

Lost the Republican primary
 Jayme Stevenson, Darien First Selectman
 Erin Stewart, Mayor of New Britain

Withdrew
 Ann Brookes, attorney
 Peter Tesei, Greenwich First Selectman

Endorsements

Results

Independent

Candidates

Declared
 Oz Griebel, businessman and Republican candidate for governor in 2010
Running mate: Monte Frank, former president of the Connecticut Bar Association.

Declined
 Joe Scarborough, television personality and former Republican U.S. Representative from Florida

Withdrew
 Micah Welintukonis, former Coventry town councilman and army veteran

Endorsements

General election

Endorsements

Debates

Predictions

Polling

with Ned Lamont and Mark Boughton

with Ned Lamont and Erin Stewart

with Susan Bysiewicz and Erin Stewart

with Susan Bysiewicz and Mark Boughton

with generic Democrat and Republican

Results

See also
 2018 United States gubernatorial elections

References

External links
Candidates at Vote Smart
Candidates at Ballotpedia

Debates
GOP Primary Debate, December 6, 2017
GOP Primary Debate, January 10, 2018
GOP Primary Debate, February 21, 2018

Official gubernatorial campaign websites
Oz Griebel (I) for Governor
Rod Hanscomb (L) for Governor
Ned Lamont (D) for Governor
Bob Stefanowski (R) for Governor

Official lieutenant gubernatorial campaign websites
Susan Bysiewicz (D) for Lieutenant Governor
Joe Markley (R) for Lieutenant Governor

Gubernatorial
2018
2018
Connecticut